Eleanor Jane Alexander MBE (1857 - 3 June 1939), was a poet and novelist who was made a Member of the Order of the British Empire for her work during the war.

Early life and education

Born Eleanor Jane Alexander in Strabane, County Tyrone in 1857 to Cecil Frances Humphreys and Rev. William Alexander, G.C.V.O. Her father became Archbishop of Armagh and Primate of All Ireland. He also wrote and published poetry. Her mother was a poet and wrote hymns. Alexander had two brothers and a sister. Her brother Robert Jocelyn Alexander, also a poet, was killed when the RMS Leinster was torpedoed on 10 October 1918. Her mother died in 1895.

Alexander wrote for The Spectator, the Belfast Telegraph and The Times and wrote Lady Anne's Walk which was a miscellany of reflections based on the sketches of Lady Anne Beresford. She also wrote novels and biographies which detailed life in Ulster and recorded local dialects. She worked on a collection of humorous pieces at the start of the First World War. She was awarded her MBE for her hospital war work and was also awarded the title of Lady of Grace St. John of Jerusalem.

Alexander lived with her father until he died in 1924. She was granted permission to live in rooms in Prince Edward's Lodgings, Hampton Court Palace by George V in honour of her father's work. She died on 3 June 1939.  She is buried in Derry.

Bibliography
 Lady Anne's Walk
 The Rambling Rector
 The Lady of the Well
 Primate Alexander: Archbishop of Armagh: A Memoir

References and sources

1857 births
1939 deaths
Irish poets